Joost R. Hiltermann is a Dutch activist, journalist and writer. He is the Program Director, MENA for International Crisis Group. He was previously its  Chief Operating Officer.

Education
Hiltermann earned an MA degree in International Relations from Johns Hopkins School of Advanced International Studies in 1980, and  a PhD in  Sociology from University of California, Santa Cruz in 1988.

Published works
A Poisonous Affair: America, Iraq, and the Gassing of Halabja Cambridge University Press (2007) 
Behind the Intifada: Labor and Women’s Movements in the Occupied Territories Princeton University Press (1991)

References

Living people
Year of birth missing (living people)
Dutch journalists